is the 31st single by Japanese singer/songwriter Chisato Moritaka. Written by Moritaka and Hiromasa Ijichi, the single was released by One Up Music on February 25, 1997. Two versions of the single were released: an 8 cm CD single and an EP version on 12-inch LP - both wth different tracks. The song was used by Lawson for their store commercials.

Chart performance 
"Let's Go!" peaked at No. 19 on Oricon's singles chart and sold 93,000 copies. It was also certified Gold by the RIAJ.

Other versions 
Moritaka re-recorded the song and uploaded the video on her YouTube channel on August 29, 2013. This version is also included in Moritaka's 2014 self-covers DVD album Love Vol. 5.

Track listing 
All lyrics are written by Chisato Moritaka; all music is arranged by Yuichi Takahashi.

Personnel 
 Chisato Moritaka – vocals, drums, kalimba
 Yuichi Takahashi – acoustic guitar, keyboards
 Shin Hashimoto – piano, keyboard, Fender Rhodes, kalimba, clarinet, synthesizer
 Yukio Seto – electric guitar, bass, wind chime, percussion, djembe, didgeridoo
 Haruomi Hosono – synthesizer programming, keyboards

Chart positions

Certification

References

External links 
 
 
 

1997 singles
1997 songs
Japanese-language songs
Chisato Moritaka songs
Songs with lyrics by Chisato Moritaka
Songs with music by Hiromasa Ijichi
One Up Music singles